Jayaseelan "Jay" Naidoo (born in 1954) is a South African politician and businessman who served as the founding general secretary of the Congress of South African Trade Unions (COSATU) from 1985 to 1993. He then served as Minister responsible for the Reconstruction and Development Programme in the first post-apartheid cabinet of President Nelson Mandela (1994–1996) and as Minister of Post, Telecommunications, and Broadcasting (1996–1999).

Naidoo was a member of the NEC of the African National Congress. He was at the forefront of the struggle against apartheid leading the largest trade union federation in South Africa.

Early life and education 
Born in 1954, Naidoo enrolled at the University of Durban-Westville to study for a Bachelor of Science (BSc) degree in pursuance of a medical career in 1975 to be a medical doctor but his studies were interrupted by the political turmoil at the time because of student uprisings.

Career

Political career 
Naidoo became active in the South African Students' Organisation (SASO) that was banned in 1977 just after its leader Steve Biko was murdered in police detention. He then became a community-based organizer working with grassroots civic structures. He joined the Federation of South African Trade Unions as a volunteer in 1979. Naidoo was later appointed secretary general of the Sweet, Food and Allied Workers' Union (SFAWU). In this capacity, he led the country's largest ever nationwide strike with around 3.5 million participants in 1991, paralyzing factories and businesses across South Africa and leaving people without the basic services normally provided by black employees.

In 1995, Naidoo served on the selection panel appointed by President Mandela to interview and shortlist candidates for South Africa's Truth and Reconciliation Commission.

Later career 
From 2002 until 2015, Naidoo was chair of the board of directors and chair of the Partnership Council of the Global Alliance for Improved Nutrition (GAIN) headquartered in Geneva and launched at the 2002 UN Summit on Children as a public private partnership to tackle malnutrition facing 2 billion people in the world. He is the founder of the social development arm of an investment and management company, J&J Group, which he co-founded in 2000 in South Africa.

From 2001 to 2010, Naidoo served as chairperson of the Development Bank of Southern Africa (DBSA), the premier development finance institution driving infrastructure in the SADC region.

In 2010, Naidoo reportedly sold off a third of his stake in J&J Group and donated the proceeds to two unnamed charitable trusts. He has published his autobiography, ‘Fighting for Justice’ and more recently published his book 'Change: Organising Tomorrow, Today.'

In 2013, at the request of the French Minister of Development, Pascal Canfin, Naidoo co-authored a report (with Emmanuel Faber) on reforming Official Development Assistance. That same year, he chaired an international inquiry into labour rights violations in Swaziland, alongside Alec Muchadehama, Paul Verryn and Nomthetho Simelane.

Other activities

Corporate boards 

 Old Mutual, non-executive member of the board of directors (since 2007)
 Hystra, member of the advisory board

Non-profit organizations 
 Mo Ibrahim Foundation, member of the board
 Advanced Development for Africa (ADA), member of the international advisory board (since 2013)
 Bill & Melinda Gates Foundation, Member of the Global Health Program Advisory Panel (since 2008)
 'Earthrise Trust', member of the board of trustees
 International Telecommunication Union (ITU), member of the Telecom Board
 ‘Scatterlings of Africa’, patron
 LoveLife South Africa, member of the board of trustees (2003–2010)
 Global Alliance for Improved Nutrition, Board Chairman

Recognition 
For his accomplishments Naidoo has gained many honors, including becoming the Chevalier de la Légion d’Honneur (Legion of Honour), one of France's highest decorations, and received the ‘Drivers for Change Award’ from the Southern African Trust and Mail & Guardian newspaper in October 2010.

His most recent awards include the Ellen Kuzwayo Award from the University of Johannesburg, in November 2012, as well as an honorary doctorate technology degree in engineering and the built environment from the Durban University of Technology, awarded September 2013.

Personal life 
Jay Naidoo is married to Lucie Pagé, an award-winning French-Canadian writer and journalist, and regards his three children as his greatest achievement.

References

External links
 , Naidoo's social justice blog

Living people
1954 births
Congress of South African Trade Unions
South African trade unionists
South African activists
South African people of Indian descent
Communications ministers of South Africa
Members of the National Assembly of South Africa